Gediminas Bagdonas (born 26 December 1985) is a Lithuanian former professional road racing cyclist, who competed professionally between 2007 and 2019 for the Klaipeda–Splendid, Ulan, Team Piemonte,  and  teams. He was named in the start list for the 2015 Vuelta a España. Following his retirement, Bagdonas now works as a directeur sportif for UCI Continental team .

Since 2023 Bagdonas is one of the coaches of Lithuanian national track team.

Major results
Source: 

2003
 3rd  Team pursuit, UEC European Junior Track Championships
2004
 3rd Time trial, National Road Championships
2005
 3rd  Team pursuit, UEC European Under-23 Track Championships
 3rd Overall Olympia's Tour
1st Young rider classification
 7th La Côte Picarde
2006
 UEC European Under-23 Track Championships
2nd  Individual pursuit
3rd  Team pursuit
 2nd Time trial, National Road Championships
2007
 1st  Time trial, National Road Championships
 1st  Overall Triptyque des Barrages
1st Mountains classification
1st Stage 2 (ITT)
 5th E.O.S. Tallinn GP
 7th Overall Okolo Slovenska
 7th Beverbeek Classic
 7th Schaal Sels
2008
 5th Overall Dookoła Mazowsza
 6th Tartu GP
 8th Overall Five Rings of Moscow
2009
 1st Memorial Van Coningsloo
 2nd Road race, National Road Championships
 3rd  Individual pursuit, 2009–10 UCI Track Cycling World Cup Classics, Cali
 8th Grand Prix Criquielion
2010
 4th Tartu GP
2011
 National Road Championships
1st  Time trial
2nd Road race
 1st  Overall An Post Rás
1st Stages 2 & 4
 1st  Overall Ronde de l'Oise
1st Stage 2
 1st Stage 7 Tour of Britain
 7th Overall Baltic Chain Tour
1st Prologue & Stage 1
2012
 National Road Championships
1st  Road race
3rd Time trial
 1st  Overall Baltic Chain Tour
1st Stages 2, 4 & 5
 1st Ronde van Noord-Holland
 1st Memorial Van Coningsloo
 2nd Rund um Köln
 2nd Omloop der Kempen
 3rd  Omnium, UEC European Track Championships
 3rd Omloop van het Waasland
 5th Zellik–Galmaarden
 7th Handzame Classic
 8th Overall Driedaagse van West-Vlaanderen
 9th Overall An Post Rás
1st  Points classification
1st Stages 3 & 8
2013
 2nd Time trial, National Road Championships
2014
 1st Sprints classification Four Days of Dunkirk
 3rd Time trial, National Road Championships
 8th Cholet-Pays de Loire
2015
 2nd Time trial, National Road Championships
 6th Paris–Bourges
 10th Grand Prix de la Somme
2016
 6th Grand Prix de la Somme
2017
 National Road Championships
2nd Time trial
2nd Road race
 8th Overall Tour du Poitou-Charentes
2018
 National Road Championships
1st  Road race
1st  Time trial
 5th Overall Boucles de la Mayenne
 5th Le Samyn
 6th Overall Tour Poitou-Charentes en Nouvelle-Aquitaine
2019
 1st  Time trial, National Road Championships
 5th Time trial, European Games
2020
 National Road Championships
1st  Road race
2nd Time trial

Grand Tour general classification results timeline

References

External links

1985 births
Living people
People from Kėdainiai District Municipality
Lithuanian male cyclists
Cyclists at the 2012 Summer Olympics
Olympic cyclists of Lithuania
Sportspeople from Kėdainiai
Rás Tailteann winners
European Games competitors for Lithuania
Cyclists at the 2019 European Games
Lithuanian cycling coaches